A cervix or collum is a neck, that is, a narrowed region of an object (such as a body or a body part). In anatomy, various body parts are called necks, with the neck (of the body) and the neck of the uterus (the uterine cervix) being major examples. A list of examples includes: 

 Neck, the narrowed region of the body between the torso and the head
 Uterine cervix, usually just called the cervix when the context is implicit
 Cervix vesicae urinariae, the neck of the urinary bladder
 Cervix cornus dorsalis medullae spinalis or cervix cornus posterioris medullae spinalis, the neck of the posterior grey column (the posterior horn of the spinal cord)
 Cervix dentis, the neck of a tooth (a slightly narrowed area where the crown meets the root, such as on a molar tooth)
 Cervix (insect anatomy), a membrane that separates the head from the thorax in insects

See also
 Neck (disambiguation)
 Collum (disambiguation)